This is a list of composers for science fiction television series Doctor Who. It is sortable by a number of different criteria. The list defaults to ascending alphabetical order the composer's last name.

Doctor Who composers 

The Revived Series' original soundtracks were entirely composed by Murray Gold for the first ten series. Gold utilised an orchestra score for many episodes, with heavy use of leitmotifs for characters such as the Doctor, the companions and monsters. Gold's music was played at the Proms, such as for the 50th anniversary celebration. Several singers performed in the soundtracks of these series, for instance, Neil Hannon in "Song for Ten". However, the programme had previously had a singer - The Gunfighters featured Lynda Baron singing "The Ballad of the Last Chance Saloon" in 1966.

Segun Akinola replaced Gold for the duration of the Thirteenth Doctor's run. Akinola's scores tended to be more ambient than Gold's, with a great variety of instruments for different episodes.

Stock music
Instead of using specially composed music, some serials were scored completely with pre-recorded stock music.  Some of these serials used music by one composer as noted below:

The Edge of Destruction
The Web Planet - Music by Les Structures Sonores
The Space Museum
Galaxy 4 - Music by Les Structures Sonores
Mission to the Unknown - Music by Trevor Duncan
The Massacre of St Bartholomew's Eve - Music by Pierre Arvey
The War Machines
The Tenth Planet 
The Highlanders
The Moonbase
The Faceless Ones
The Tomb of the Cybermen
The Enemy of the World - Music by Béla Bartók
The Web of Fear
The Mind Robber - Music by Anton Bruckner
Inferno

Spinoff composers

Notes

References

Composers
Music based on Doctor Who
Lists of composers